Jerell Anthony Sellars (born 11 December 1995) is an English footballer who plays as a forward for Redditch United.

Sellars is a graduate of the Aston Villa Academy and played on loan at English Football League clubs Wycombe Wanderers and Cheltenham Town before moving to Östersund in Sweden.

Career

Aston Villa
Sellars joined Aston Villa in 2012 from Lincoln City. He never made a senior appearance and was released in 2017. On 24 March 2016, Sellars followed teammate Benjamin Siegrist by joining League Two side Wycombe Wanderers on loan until the end of the 2015–16 season.

Cheltenham Town
On 7 July 2017, Sellers joined League Two side Cheltenham Town. On 21 June 2018, it was announced that Sellars would leave Cheltenham at the end of the month upon the expiry of his contract.

Östersunds FK
On 23 July 2018, Sellars joined the Swedish club Östersund in the top Swedish league Allsvenskan. He scored his first goal in Swedish football on 11 November 2018, in a 3–3 home draw against Hammarby.

Redditch United
On 4 November 2022, Sellars joined Redditch United.

Personal life
Jerell's step father is former footballer and coach Terry Fleming. 

His brother, Tyrell, is in the Scunthorpe United academy.

Career statistics

References

External links

1995 births
Association football forwards
Lincoln City F.C. players
Aston Villa F.C. players
Wycombe Wanderers F.C. players
Cheltenham Town F.C. players
Östersunds FK players
Allsvenskan players
Living people
Black British sportspeople
English footballers
English expatriate footballers
Expatriate footballers in Sweden
English expatriate sportspeople in Sweden